Wanzhou North railway station is a railway station in Wanzhou District, Chongqing, China. It is served by the Zhengzhou–Wanzhou high-speed railway and the Chongqing–Wanzhou intercity railway. It is one of two passenger railway stations in Wanzhou and the first to offer high-speed service. The other station is Wanzhou railway station which is served by trains on conventional lines.

History
Wanzhou North railway station opened on 28 November 2016 along with the Chongqing–Wanzhou intercity railway. The station became a terminus of the Zhengzhou–Wanzhou high-speed railway on 20 June 2022.

Future

The station will also be the terminus of a new Chongqing–Wanzhou route, Chongqing–Wanzhou high-speed railway, which will be faster and more direct than the existing route.

References 

Railway stations in Chongqing
Railway stations in China opened in 2016